Fuad Borisovich Yakubovsky (August 3 (16), 1908 - March 27, 1975) was Minister of Installation and Special Construction Works of the USSR from 1965 to 1975. Candidate member of the CPSU Central Committee (1966-1975), deputy of the Supreme Soviet of the USSR 7-9 convocations.

References

1908 births
1975 deaths
Soviet engineers
People's commissars and ministers of the Soviet Union